McCourty is a surname. Notable people with the surname include:

Devin McCourty (born 1987), American football player
Jason McCourty (born 1987), American football player, twin brother of Devin
William McCourty (1884–1917), English footballer

See also
McGourty